The Anupitaka (Pāli, literally, meaning "after piaka") is the collected non-canonical or extra-canonical Pāli literature of Buddhism.

Overview
The Tipitaka (Pāli canon)  was first committed to writing sometime in the 1st century BC. 

The non-canonical or extra-canonical Pāli literature can be regarded as falling into three historical periods.  The first ("classical") period stretches from about the 3rd century BC to about the 5th century AD. The second ("commentarial") period extends from the 5th century to the 11th century, and the third ("modern") period begins with the 12th century.

Classical period
The literature of the first period consists of some classical works of which only a few now survive. To this period belongs:

Nettipakarana (the book of guidance)
Petakopadesa (Instruction on the Tipitaka)
Milindapañha (The questions of Milinda)

The Nettipakarana and Petakopadesa are introductions to the teachings of Buddhism. These books present methods of interpretation, means exposition of that which leads to the knowledge of the good law. Petakopadesa is the 'Instruction on the Tipitaka'.  The source material derives directly from the Sutta pitaka.  Milindapañhã, written in the style of suttas, contains a dialogue between the Indo-Greek king Menander (in Pāli, Milinda) and the Thera Nãgasena, which throws a flood of light on certain important points of Buddhism.

These three books appear in the Khuddaka Nikaya of the Burmese Tipitaka, while the first two appear in the Sinhalese printed edition.

See also
 Pali Canon
 Paracanonical texts (Theravada Buddhism)
 Atthakatha
 Khuddaka Nikaya
 List of Pali Canon anthologies
 Pali literature
 Subcommentaries, Theravada

Notes

Sources
 Matthews, Bruce (1995). "Post-Classical Developments in the Concepts of Karma and Rebirth in Theravāda Buddhism," in Ronald W. Neufeldt (ed.), Karma and Rebirth: Post-Classical Developments. Delhi, Sri Satguru Publications. (Originally published by the State University of New York, 1986). .

External links
 Bullitt, John (2002). Beyond the Tipitaka: A Field Guide to Post-canonical Pali Literature.  Retrieved 2008-07-11 from "Access to Insight" at http://www.accesstoinsight.org/lib/authors/bullitt/fieldguide.html.

Pali literature
Theravada literature